Talasea Rural LLG is a local-level government (LLG) of West New Britain Province, Papua New Guinea.

Wards
01. Nalobu
02. Boge
03. Gabuna
04. Bola
05. Warou
06. Tabekemeli
07. Bulu
08. Valupai
09. Baliondo
10. Bunga

References

Local-level governments of West New Britain Province